Caesaria may refer to:

Caesaria the Elder, abbess of Arles (512–c.525)
Caesaria the Younger, abbess of Arles (c.525–c.560), niece of the prec.

See also
 Caesarea (disambiguation)
 Caesarian